Kimmo Pallonen (born 17 January 1959 in Jyväskylän maalaiskunta) is a retired male pole vaulter from Finland. His personal best jump was 5.56 metres, achieved in July 1982 in Raahe. He became Finnish champion in 1979, 1981, 1984 and 1985.

Achievements

References

1959 births
Living people
Sportspeople from Jyväskylä
Finnish male pole vaulters
Athletes (track and field) at the 1984 Summer Olympics
Olympic athletes of Finland
20th-century Finnish people